Sperata aor, the long-whiskered catfish ( aiṛ,  ãri), is a species of catfish of the family Bagridae found in southern Asia in the nations of India, Pakistan, Nepal, Bangladesh and Myanmar. It is also a popular gamefish.

References 
 

long-whiskered catfish
Freshwater fish of South Asia
Fish of Myanmar
fish of Bangladesh
long-whiskered catfish
Taxa named by Francis Buchanan-Hamilton